The siege of Alkmaar (1573) was a turning point in the Eighty Years' War. The burghers of the Dutch city of Alkmaar held off the Spanish (who had set up their camp in Oudorp) between 21 August and 8 October 1573, with boiling tar and burning branches from their renewed city walls. On 23 September William the Silent followed up on a request by Cabeliau dating from the beginning of the siege and ordered the dikes surrounding Alkmaar to be breached, thereby flooding the polders in which the Spanish troops were camped, like the Achtermeer polder. This forced the Spanish commander, Don Fadrique, the son of the hated Alva himself, to retreat and the last Spanish soldiers left on 8 October 1573.

The end of the siege is considered a turning point in the Eighty Years' War as Alkmaar was the first city to overcome a siege by the Spanish army.

The garrison included a detachment of Scots soldiers who had previously tried to defend Haarlem.

Several archaeological examinations have uncovered remains of the battle.

References 
Citations

Bibliography
 
 

1573 in Europe
Conflicts in 1573
Alkmaar
Alkmaar
Alkmaar
Alkmaar 1573
Alkmaar